Bogoria  is a village in Staszów County, Świętokrzyskie Voivodeship, in south-central Poland. It is the seat of the gmina (administrative district) called Gmina Bogoria. Bogoria has a population of  1,053, and belongs to historic Lesser Poland. The village had town privileges from 1616 until 1869. It is notable for its 18th-century baroque church of Holy Trinity, which was built by the castellan of Sandomierz Michał Konarski, in 1748-1778, replacing a wooden church from 1620. 

The name of the village comes from the Bogoria family, which resided in the nearby village of Skotniki. In 1578, Bogoria was a small settlement, and a local nobleman named Krzysztof Bogoria Podlecki decided to found here a town. In 1616, King Zygmunt III Waza granted it Magdeburg rights, and Bogoria quickly developed, with its own town hall, artisans and eight fairs every year. The town belonged to Lesser Poland’s Sandomierz Voivodeship, and like other locations, it was completely destroyed by Swedish soldiers in the Deluge (1655 - 1660). In 1662, it had only 300 inhabitants, and by 1676, the population shrank to 100. In the 18th century, the situation improved, with merchants and cloth makers opening their shops here. In 1770, however, Bogoria burned, together with the town hall. By 1827, when after the Partitions of Poland, the town belonged to the Russian-controlled Congress Poland, it had the population of 425, with 73 houses. Bogoria lost its town charter after the November Uprising (1869), together with a number of other towns of northern Lesser Poland. During World War II, Bogoria was one of centers of the Home Army. The Germans destroyed 80% of the village.

Demography 
According to the 2002 Poland census, there were 1,038 people residing in Bogoria village, of whom 47.6% were male and 52.4% were female. In the village, the population was spread out, with 26.6% under the age of 18, 37.6% from 18 to 44, 17.2% from 45 to 64, and 18.6% who were 65 years of age or older.
 Figure 1. Population pyramid of village in 2002 — by age group and sex

References

Bogoria
Sandomierz Voivodeship
Radom Governorate
Kielce Voivodeship (1919–1939)